The 2020–21 season was the 122nd season in the existence of FC Bayern Munich and the club's 56th consecutive season in the top flight of German football. In addition to the domestic league, Bayern Munich participated in this season's editions of the DFB-Pokal, the DFL-Supercup, the UEFA Champions League, the UEFA Super Cup, and the FIFA Club World Cup. The season covered the period from 24 August 2020 to 30 June 2021.

As a result of winning last season's Bundesliga and DFB-Pokal, they qualified for this season's DFL-Supercup, which they won. Additionally, as a result of winning last season's UEFA Champions League, they qualified for both the UEFA Super Cup as well as the FIFA Club World Cup for this season and won both of those competitions as well. Collectively, winning all six competitions available in the 2020 calendar year, namely the 2019-2020 season's Bundesliga, DFB-Pokal, and UEFA Champions League followed by the 2020-2021 season's DFL-Supercup, UEFA Super Cup, and FIFA Club World Cup was a feat known as the "sextuple" and this was one of only two times the feat had been accomplished in the history of European football.

Players

First-team squad

Players on loan

Transfers

In

Out

Competitions

Overview

Bundesliga

League table

Results summary

Results by round

Matches
The league fixtures were announced on 7 August 2020.

DFB-Pokal

DFL-Supercup

UEFA Champions League

Group stage

The group stage draw was held on 1 October 2020.

Knockout phase

Round of 16
The draw for the round of 16 was held on 14 December 2020.

Quarter-finals
The draw for the quarter-finals was held on 19 March 2021.

UEFA Super Cup

FIFA Club World Cup

Statistics

Appearances and goals

|-
! colspan=18 style=background:#dcdcdc; text-align:center| Goalkeepers

|-
! colspan=18 style=background:#dcdcdc; text-align:center| Defenders

|-
! colspan=18 style=background:#dcdcdc; text-align:center| Midfielders

|-
! colspan=18 style=background:#dcdcdc; text-align:center| Forwards

|-
! colspan=18 style=background:#dcdcdc; text-align:center| Players transferred out during the season

|-

Goalscorers

Notes

References

External links

FC Bayern Munich seasons
Bayern Munich
Bayern Munich
Bayern Munich
FIFA Club World Cup-winning seasons
German football championship-winning seasons